In the Constellation of the Black Widow is the fifth studio album by British extreme metal band Anaal Nathrakh, released on 29 June 2009 by Candlelight Records. The album was also released on LP, limited to 500 copies. 250 copies are pressed on black and white splatter vinyl, and 250 copies are pressed on black and purple vinyl.

The album title is derived from a passage in the book Moment of Freedom by Norwegian writer Jens Bjørneboe. The cover art is taken from Gustave Doré's illustrations to "The Raven". "Satanarchrist" is a re-recording from Total Fucking Necro.

Track listing

Personnel
Anaal Nathrakh
V.I.T.R.I.O.L. – vocals
Mick Kenney – guitars, bass, drums, drum programming

Additional musicians
Zeitgeist Memento (Repvblika) – vocals ("Oil Upon the Sores of Lepers")
Barm "Ventnor" Frog – additional guitars ("In the Constellation of the Black Widow", "More of Fire Than Blood")

References

2009 albums
Anaal Nathrakh albums
Candlelight Records albums
FETO Records albums